A kerosene lamp (also known as a paraffin lamp in some countries) is a type of lighting device that uses kerosene as a fuel. Kerosene lamps have a wick or mantle as light source, protected by a glass chimney or globe; lamps may be used on a table, or hand-held lanterns may be used for portable lighting. Like oil lamps, they are useful for lighting without electricity, such as in regions without rural electrification, in electrified areas during power outages, at campsites, and on boats. There are three types of kerosene lamp: flat-wick, central-draft (tubular round wick), and mantle lamp. Kerosene lanterns meant for portable use have a flat wick and are made in dead-flame, hot-blast, and cold-blast variants.

Pressurized kerosene lamps use a gas mantle; these are known as Petromax, Tilley lamps, or Coleman lamps, among other manufacturers. They produce more light per unit of fuel than wick-type lamps, but are more complex and expensive in construction and more complex to operate. A hand-pump pressurizes air, which forces liquid fuel from a reservoir into a gas chamber. Vapor from the chamber burns, heating a mantle to incandescence and also providing heat.

Kerosene lamps are widely used for lighting in rural areas of Africa and Asia, where electricity is not distributed or is too costly.

History 
In 1813, John Tilley invented the hydro-pneumatic blowpipe. In 1818, William Henry Tilley, gas fitters, was manufacturing gas lamps in Stoke Newington.

In 1846, Abraham Pineo Gesner invented a substitute for whale oil for lighting, distilled from coal. Later made from petroleum, paraffin lamp became a popular lighting fuel. Modern and most popular versions of the paraffin lamp were later constructed by Polish inventor and pharmacist Ignacy Łukasiewicz, in Lviv in 1853. It was a significant improvement over lamps designed to burn vegetable or sperm oil.

In 1914, the Coleman Lantern pressure lamp was introduced by the Coleman Company.

In 1919, Tilley High-Pressure Gas Company started using kerosene as a fuel for lamps.

Types

Flat-wick lamp 

A flat-wick lamp is a simple type of kerosene lamp, which burns kerosene drawn up through a wick by capillary action. If this type of lamp is broken, it can easily start a fire. A flat-wick lamp has a fuel tank (fount), with the lamp burner attached. Attached to the fuel tank, four prongs hold the glass chimney, which acts to prevent the flame from being blown out and enhances a thermally induced draft. The glass chimney needs a "throat", or slight constriction, to create the proper draft for complete combustion of the fuel; the draft carries more air (oxygen) past the flame, helping to produce a smokeless light, which is brighter than an open flame would produce.

The chimney is used for a more important duty.  The mantle/wick holder has holes around the outer edges.  When the lantern is lit and a chimney is attached, the thermally induced draft draws air through these holes and passes over the top of the mantle, just as a chimney in your house.  This has a cooling effect and keeps the mantle from over heating.  Without a properly installed chimney, a definite safety condition exists.  This is even more important if using Aladdin  lamps.  They also have a thinner chimney to induce a faster air-flow.  This information should be adhered to regardless of the type of lantern in use.

The lamp burner has a flat wick, usually made of cotton. The lower part of the wick dips into the fount and absorbs the kerosene; the top part of the wick extends out of the wick tube of the lamp burner, which includes a wick-adjustment mechanism. Adjusting how much of the wick extends above the wick tube controls the flame. The wick tube surrounds the wick and ensures that the correct amount of air reaches the lamp burner.  Adjustment is usually done by means of a small knob operating a cric, which is a toothed metal sprocket bearing against the wick.  If the wick is too high, and extends beyond the burner cone at the top of the wick tube, the lamp will produce smoke and soot (unburned carbon). When the lamp is lit, the kerosene that the wick has absorbed burns and produces a clear, bright, yellow flame.  As the kerosene burns, capillary action in the wick draws more kerosene up from the fuel tank. All kerosene flat-wick lamps use the dead-flame burner design, where the flame is fed cold air from below, and hot air exits above.

This type of lamp was very widely used by railways, both on the front and rear of trains and for hand signals, due to its reliability.  At a time when there were few competing light sources at night outside major towns, the limited brightness of these lamps was adequate and could be seen at sufficient distance to serve as a warning or signal.

Central-draft (tubular round wick) lamp 

A central-draft lamp, or Argand lamp, works in the same manner as the flat-wick lamp. The burner uses a wick, usually made of cotton, that is made of a wide, flat wick rolled into a tube, the seam of which is then stitched together to form the complete wick. The tubular wick is then mounted into a "carrier", which is some form of a toothed rack that engages into the gears of the wick-raising mechanism of the burner and allows the wick to be raised and lowered. The wick rides in between the inner and outer wick tubes; the inner wick tube (central draft tube) provides the "central draft" or draft that supplies air to the flame spreader. When the lamp is lit, the central draft tube supplies air to the flame spreader that spreads out the flame into a ring of fire and allows the lamp to burn cleanly.

Mantle lamp 

A variation on the "central-draft" lamp is the mantle lamp. The mantle is a roughly pear-shaped mesh made of fabric placed over the burner. The mantle typically contains thorium or other rare-earth salts; on first use the cloth burns away, and the rare-earth salts are converted to oxides, leaving a very fragile structure, which incandesces (glows brightly) upon exposure to the heat of the burner flame. Mantle lamps are considerably brighter than flat- or round-wick lamps, produce a whiter light and generate more heat. Mantle lamps typically use fuel faster than a flat-wick lamp, but slower than a center-draft round-wick, as they depend on a small flame heating a mantle, rather than having all the light coming from the flame itself.

Mantle lamps are nearly always bright enough to benefit from a lampshade, and a few mantle lamps may be enough to heat a small building in cold weather. Mantle lamps, because of the higher temperature at which they operate, do not produce much odor, except when first lit or extinguished.  Like flat- and round-wick lamps, they can be adjusted for brightness; however, caution must be used, because if set too high, the lamp chimney and the mantle can become covered with black areas of soot. A lamp set too high will burn off its soot harmlessly if quickly turned down, but if not caught soon enough, the soot itself can ignite, and a "runaway lamp" condition can result.

All unpressurized mantle lamps are based on the Argand lamp that was improved by the Clamond basket mantle. These lamps were popular from 1882 until shortly after WWII, when rural electrification made them obsolete. Aladdin Lamps is the only maker of this style lamp today. Even they, are now marketing electric fixtures that fit the old style lamps.

Large fixed pressurized kerosene mantle lamps were used in lighthouse beacons for navigation of ships, brighter and with lower fuel consumption than oil lamps used before. An early version of the gas mantle lamp, kerosene was vaporized by a secondary burner, which pressurized the kerosene tank that supplied the central draught. Like all gas mantle lamps, the only purpose of the burner is to hold the flame that heats the mantle, which is 4-5 times as bright as the wick itself. The Coleman camping lantern is the direct descendant of this type lamp.

Kerosene lantern 

A kerosene lantern, also known as a "barn lantern" or "hurricane lantern", is a flat-wick lamp made for portable and outdoor use. They are made of soldered or crimped-together sheet-metal stampings, with tin-plated sheet steel being the most common material, followed by brass and copper. There are three types: dead-flame, hot-blast, and cold-blast. Both hot-blast and cold-blast designs are called tubular lanterns and are safer than dead-flame lamps, as tipping over a tubular lantern cuts off the oxygen flow to the burner and will extinguish the flame within seconds.

The earliest portable kerosene "glass globe" lanterns, of the 1850s and 1860s, were of the dead-flame type, meaning that it had an open wick, but the airflow to the flame was strictly controlled in an upward motion by a combination of vents at the bottom of the burner and an open topped chimney.  This had the effect of removing side-to-side drafts and thus significantly reducing or even eliminating the flickering that can occur with an exposed flame.

Later lanterns, such as the hot-blast and cold-blast lanterns, took this airflow control even further by partially or fully enclosing the wick in a "deflector" or "burner cone" and then channeling the air to be supplied for combustion at the wick while at the same time pre-heating the air for combustion.

As noted in the patent, the "novel mode of constructing a lantern whereby the wind, instead of acting upon the flame in such a manner as to extinguish it, serves to support or sustain and prevent the extinguishment thereof." This improvement essentially redirected wind which might normally tend to extinguish the flame of an unprotected dead-flame lantern, instead is redirected, slowed, pre-heated, and supplied to the burner to actually support and promote the combustion of the fuel.

This design is similar to his earlier "hot-blast" design, except that the oxygen-depleted hot combustion byproducts are redirected and prevented from recirculating back to the burner by redesigning the intake products, so that only oxygen-rich, fresh air is drawn from the atmosphere into the lamp ("the inlets for fresh air are placed out of the ascending current of products of combustion, and said products are thereby prevented from entering [the air intake]"). The primary benefit of this design compared to the earlier "hot-blast" design was to maximize the amount of oxygen available for combustion by ensuring that only fresh air is supplied to the burner, thereby increasing the brightness and stability of the flame.

Safety

Combustion 

Contamination of lamp fuel with even a small amount of gasoline results in a lower flash point and higher vapor pressure for the fuel, with potentially dangerous consequences.  Vapors from spilled fuel may ignite; vapor trapped above liquid fuel may lead to excess pressure and fires. Kerosene lamps are still extensively used in areas without electrical lighting; the cost and dangers of combustion lighting are a continuing concern in many countries.

Inhalation 

The World Health Organization considers kerosene to be a polluting fuel and recommends that “governments and practitioners immediately stop promoting its household use”. Kerosene smoke contains high levels of harmful particulate matter, and household use of kerosene is associated with higher risks of cancer, respiratory infections, asthma, tuberculosis, cataract, and adverse pregnancy outcomes.

Performance 
Flat-wick lamps have the lowest light output, center-draft round-wick lamps have 3–4 times the output of flat-wick lamps, and pressurized lamps have higher output yet; the range is from 8 to 100 lumens.

12.57 lumens = 1 CP

See also 
 Candles
 List of light sources
 Robert Edwin Newbery
 Safe bottle lamp

Notes

References

External links 

 
 Information on blinking kerosene lamps
 Information on Dietz Kerosene Lamps and Lanterns
 Making and Repairing Kerosene Lamps
 Oil Lamp Basics for Survivalists

Austrian inventions
History of the petroleum industry
Fireplaces
Polish inventions
Rural society
Oil lamp
Iranian inventions